Skive fH (Skive forenede Håndboldklubber) is a handball club from Skive. The club has a team in the men's 1st Division. They play their home matches in Freja Arena.

The Club is a fusion between Skive KFUM and Skive Håndboldklub and is among the country's biggest handball clubs with approximately 600 members and 10 senior teams.

History/Squad

Men's team
In season 2011/12 they ended second to last in the regular season and then being no. 3 in the relegation playoff, then losing by 1-2 in matches to TMS Ringsted and advanced to the 1st division. But during the summer of 2012 went AG Copenhagen bankruptcy, therefore Skive fH was offered the extra space in the league, which they accepted.

Current squad
Squad for the 2022–23 season

Goalkeepers
 1  Benjamin Boye
 30  Shadrach Nsoni
 46  Jacob Tøfting
Wingers 
LW
 7  Tobias Bay
 11  Sebastian Skøtt
 18  Christian Lorentzen
RW
 7  Viktor Ilsøe
 9  Viktor Vlastos (Injured)
 31  Oliver Juhl Refsgaard
Line players
 8  Phillip Lyngby Pedersen
 21  Jonas Raundahl 
 23  Daniel Guldsmed
 29  Søren Tau Sørensen

Back players
LB
 5  William Skovager 
 6  Matias Damgaard
 44  Johan Kofoed

CB
 4  Joachim Hyldgaard
 17  Frederik Hovgaard
 18  Jonas Hermannsen
 47  Nickolei Jensen
 81  Tobias Bro
RB
 23  Benjamin Holm

Transfers
Transfers for the 2023–24 season

Joining
  Mathias Albrektsen (CC)
  Martin Holmgaard (AC)
  Atal Lakanval (GK) (from  GOG Håndbold)
  Simon Damgaard Jensen (LW) (from  TTH Holstebro)
  Niklas Jensen (CB) (from  Mors-Thy Håndbold)
  Simon Bak Ostersen (RB) (from  HK Malmö)
  Frederik Børm (P) (from  ØIF Arendal)
  Daniel Glud (P) (from  Stoholm IF)

Leaving
  Arne Damgaard (CC) (to  HC Midtjylland)
  Peter Schilling (AC) (to  Silkeborg-Voel KFUM)
  Tobias Bay (LW) (to  Lemvig-Thyborøn Håndbold)
  Benjamin Holm (RB) (to  Halden Håndball)
  Søren Tau Sørensen (P) (to  HC Midtjylland)
  Jonas Raundahl (P) (to  Nordsjælland Håndbold) 
  Phillip Lyngby Pedersen (P) (to  TM Tønder)

References

Danish handball clubs
Skive, Denmark